Sheikh Khalifa Bin Zayed Al Nahyan Mosque, also known as "Al Ain Grand Mosque", "Sheikh Khalifa Bin Zayed Grand Mosque", or simply Sheikh Khalifa Mosque, is the largest mosque in the city of Al Ain in the Emirate of Abu Dhabi, and one of the largest mosques in the United Arab Emirates, open to the public since 12 April 2021. It is named after Sheikh Khalifa bin Zayed Al Nahyan, the Ruler of Abu Dhabi and President of the United Arab Emirates from November 2004 until his death in May 2022.

History 
Construction of the mosque was awarded to Arabian Construction Company for AED 600 million. It started in December 2013, and was initially scheduled for completion in 2016. Formerly, the biggest mosque in use in the city was that of Shaikhah Salamah, mother of the late Sheikh Zayed bin Sultan Al Nahyan, the father of Sheikh Khalifa.

Nearby, a 1000-year-old mosque dated to the Islamic Golden Age, besides other remains relevant to the region's history, was unearthed in September 2018. Its age may make it the oldest mosque in the country.

After opening in 2021, Sheikh Tahnoun bin Mohammed Al Nahyan, the Ruler's Representative in the Region of Al-Ain, offered prayers on 13 May.

Structure 

With an indoor capacity of 6,433 worshippers, and outdoor capacity of 14,029, its total capacity would be over 20,000.

Dome 
The main feature of the mosque is a huge dome, the largest of its kind in the country, covering the main prayer-hall. The dome, the largest of its kind in the country, is adorned with verses from the Quran.

See also 
 Islam in the United Arab Emirates
 List of mosques in the United Arab Emirates

References

External links 
 Sheikh Khalifa Mosque in Al Ain UAE 24.11.2015 (YouTube)
 مسجد الشيخ خليفة في العين Sheikh Khalifa Mosque in Al Ain 24.05.2016
 Alain Shaikh Khalifa Mosque from inside | Alain Grand Mosque Full Video | 12/4/21/ Opened
 Sheikh Khalifa Mosque Alain || Today Open (12 Apr 2021)
 افتتاح جامع الشيخ خليفة بن زايد في مدينة ⁧ #العين ⁩ ١٢/٤/٢٠٢١ ‏يمثل تحفة معمارية على مستوى العالم
 Prayer of Eid al-Fitr at the mosque in 2021

Mosques in Al Ain
Mosques completed in 2021